Boufarik is a district in Blida Province, Algeria. It was named after its capital, Boufarik.

Municipalities
The district is further divided into 3 municipalities:
Boufarik
Soumaâ 
Guerrouaou 

Districts of Blida Province